Green Lane railway station serves the Tranmere area of Birkenhead, Merseyside, England. The station is situated on the Chester and Ellesmere Port branches of the Wirral Line, part of the Merseyrail network.

History 
The station was opened in 1886 as the terminus of the Mersey Railway's line from Liverpool via the Mersey Railway Tunnel.  In 1891 the line was extended southwards to Rock Ferry, and was subsequently electrified in 1903.  The line was integrated into the Merseyrail network in the 1970s. Merseyrail extensions in the 1980s and 1990s allowed train services to be extended beyond Rock Ferry; first to Hooton in 1985, then to Chester in 1993 and finally Ellesmere Port in 1994.

In early June 2014 it was announced that this station would be among a small number of stations on the Merseyrail network that will be spruced up as part of a £3.7m programme of improvements. In May 2015, the ticket office closed for refurbishment works to take place, which reopened in June 2015. On 15 June, work started on the platform areas. 6 car trains did not stop at the station between 15 June and 20 July whilst some of these works took place. The old waiting shelters were replaced with new ones and a cover was placed over the majority of the Liverpool bound platform. New lighting and information boards have also been introduced throughout the station, as well as new artwork on the Chester and Ellesmere Port Platform.

Facilities
The station is staffed, 15 minutes before the first train and 15 minutes after the last train, and has platform CCTV. There is a payphone, booking office and live departure and arrival screens on the platform, for passenger information.  The station has a free car park with 60 spaces, as well as secure cycle locker with 18 spaces. There is no access to the platforms for passengers with wheelchairs or prams, as platform access involves two staircases.

Services 
As of 22 August 2022, trains operate every 30 minutes between Liverpool and Ellesmere Port.  Trains operating between Liverpool and Chester no longer call at Green Lane to improve the punctuality of services on the Chester line.  Any passengers travelling between Green Lane and Chester now need to change at Hooton. Northbound trains operate via Hamilton Square station in Birkenhead and the Mersey Railway Tunnel to Liverpool.  Southbound trains travel towards Hooton, where the lines to Chester and Ellesmere Port divide. These services are provided by Merseyrail's fleet of Class 507 and Class 508 EMUs.

Gallery

See also
 List of underground stations of the Merseyrail network

References

Further reading

External links 

Railway stations in the Metropolitan Borough of Wirral
DfT Category E stations
Former Mersey Railway stations
Railway stations in Great Britain opened in 1886
Railway stations served by Merseyrail